The Missoula floods (also known as the Spokane floods or the Bretz floods or Bretz's floods) were cataclysmic glacial lake outburst floods that swept periodically across eastern Washington and down the Columbia River Gorge at the end of the last ice age. These floods were the result of periodic sudden ruptures of the ice dam on the Clark Fork River that created Glacial Lake Missoula. After each ice dam rupture, the waters of the lake would rush down the Clark Fork and the Columbia River, flooding much of eastern Washington and the Willamette Valley in western Oregon. After the lake drained, the ice would reform, creating Glacial Lake Missoula again.

These floods have been researched since the 1920s. During the last deglaciation that followed the end of the Last Glacial Maximum, geologists estimate that a cycle of flooding and reformation of the lake lasted an average of 55 years and that the floods occurred several times over the 2,000-year period between 15,000 and 13,000 years ago. U.S. Geological Survey hydrologist Jim O'Connor and Museo Nacional de Ciencias Naturales scientist Gerardo Benito have found evidence of at least twenty-five massive floods, the largest discharging about 10 cubic kilometers per hour (2.7 million m³/s, 13 times that of the Amazon River). Alternate estimates for the peak flow rate of the largest flood include 17 cubic kilometers per hour and range up to 27 cubic kilometers per second. The maximum flow speed approached 36 meters/second (130 km/h or 80 mph).

Within the Columbia River drainage basin, detailed investigation of the Missoula floods' glaciofluvial deposits, informally known as the Hanford formation, has documented the presence of Middle and Early Pleistocene Missoula flood deposits within the Othello Channels, Columbia River Gorge, Channeled Scabland, Quincy Basin, Pasco Basin, and the Walla Walla Valley. Based on the presence of multiple interglacial calcretes interbedded with flood deposits, magnetostratigraphy, optically stimulated luminescence dating, and unconformity truncated clastic dikes, it has been estimated that the oldest of the Pleistocene Missoula floods happened before 1.5 million years ago. Because of the fragmentary nature of older glaciofluvial deposits, which have been largely removed by subsequent Missoula floods, within the Hanford formation, the exact number of older Missoula floods, which are known as ancient cataclysmic floods, that occurred during the Pleistocene cannot be estimated with any confidence.

Flood hypothesis proposed

Geologist J Harlen Bretz first recognized evidence of the catastrophic floods, which he called the Spokane floods, in the 1920s. He was researching the Channeled Scablands in Eastern Washington, the Columbia Gorge, and the Willamette Valley of Oregon. In the summer of 1922, and for the next seven years, Bretz conducted field research of the Columbia River Plateau. He had been interested in unusual erosion features in the area since 1910 after seeing a newly published topographic map of the Potholes Cataract. Bretz coined the term Channeled Scablands in 1923 to refer to the area near the Grand Coulee, where massive erosion had cut through basalt deposits.  Bretz published a paper in 1923, arguing that the Channeled Scablands in Eastern Washington were caused by massive flooding in the distant past.

Bretz's view, which was seen as arguing for a catastrophic explanation of the geology, ran against the prevailing view of uniformitarianism, and Bretz's views were initially disregarded.  The Geological Society of Washington, D.C, invited the young Bretz to present his previously published research at a January 12, 1927, meeting where several other geologists presented competing theories.  Another geologist at the meeting, J.T. Pardee, had worked with Bretz and had evidence of an ancient glacial lake that lent credence to Bretz's theories.  Bretz defended his theories, and this kicked off an acrimonious 40-year debate over the origin of the Scablands. Both Pardee and Bretz continued their research over the next 30 years, collecting and analyzing evidence that led them to identify Lake Missoula as the source of the Spokane flood and creator of the channeled scablands.

After Pardee studied the canyon of the Flathead River, he estimated that flood waters in excess of  would be required to roll the largest of the boulders moved by the flood. More recent estimates place the flow rate at ten times the flow of all current rivers combined.

The Missoula floods have also been referred to as the Bretz floods in honor of Bretz.

Flood initiation

As the depth of the water in Lake Missoula increased, the pressure at the bottom of the ice dam increased enough to lower the freezing point of water below the temperature of the ice forming the dam. This allowed liquid water to seep into minuscule cracks present in the ice dam. Over a period of time, the friction from water flowing through these cracks generated enough heat to melt the ice walls and enlarge the cracks. This allowed more water to flow through the cracks, generating more heat, allowing even more water to flow through the cracks.  This feedback cycle eventually weakened the ice dam so much that it could no longer support the pressure of the water behind it, and it failed catastrophically. This process is known as a glacial lake outburst flood, and there is evidence that many such events occurred in the distant past.

Flood events
Iceberg-rafted glacial erratics and erosion features are evidence of these events. Lake-bottom sediments deposited by the floods have contributed to the agricultural richness of the Willamette and Columbia Valleys. Glacial deposits overlaid with centuries of windblown sediments (loess) have scattered steep, southerly sloping dunes throughout the Columbia Valley, ideal conditions for orchard and vineyard development at higher latitudes.

After analysis and controversy, geologists now believe that there were 40 or more separate floods, although the exact source of the water is still being debated. The peak flow of the floods is estimated to be 27 cubic kilometers per hour (6.5 cubic miles per hour). The maximum flow speed approached 36 meters/second (130 km/h or 80 mph). Up to 1.9×1019 joules of potential energy were released by each flood (the equivalent of 4,500 megatons of TNT). For comparison, this is 90 times more powerful than the most powerful nuclear weapon ever detonated, the 50-megaton "Tsar Bomba". The cumulative effect of the floods was to excavate  of loess, sediment and basalt from the Channeled Scablands of eastern Washington and to transport it downstream.

Multiple flood hypothesis

The multiple flood hypothesis was first proposed by R.B. Waitt, Jr. in 1980. Waitt argued for a sequence of 40 or more floods. Waitt's proposal was based mainly on analysis from glacial lake bottom deposits in Ninemile Creek and the flood deposits in Burlingame Canyon. His most compelling argument for separate floods was that the Touchet bed deposits from two successive floods were found to be separated by two layers of volcanic ash (tephra) with the ash separated by a fine layer of windblown dust deposits, located in a thin layer between sediment layers ten rhythmites below the top of the Touchet beds. The tephra is Mount St. Helens ash that fell in Eastern Washington. By analogy, since there were 40 layers with comparable characteristics at Burlingame Canyon, Waitt argued they all could be considered to have similar separation in deposition time.

Controversy over number and source of floods
The controversy whether the Channeled Scabland landforms were formed mainly by multiple periodic floods, or by a single grand-scale cataclysmic flood from late Pleistocene Glacial Lake Missoula or from an unidentified Canadian source, continued through 1999.  Shaw's team of geologists reviewed the sedimentary sequences of the Touchet beds and concluded that the sequences do not automatically imply multiple floods separated by decades or centuries. Rather, they proposed that sedimentation in the Glacial Lake Missoula basin was the result of jökulhlaups draining into Lake Missoula from British Columbia to the north.  Further, Shaw's team proposed the scabland flooding might have partially originated from an enormous subglacial reservoir that extended over much of central British Columbia, particularly including the Rocky Mountain Trench, which may have discharged by several paths, including one through Lake Missoula. This discharge, if occurring concurrently with the breach of the Lake Missoula ice dam, would have provided significantly larger volumes of water.  Further, Shaw and team proposed that the rhythmic Touchet beds are the result of multiple pulses, or surges, within a single larger flood.

In 2000, a team led by Komatsu simulated the floods numerically with a 3-dimensional hydraulic model. They based the Glacial Lake Missoula discharge rate on the rate predicted for the Spokane Valley–Rathdrum Prairie immediately downstream of Glacial Lake Missoula, for which a number of previous estimates had placed the maximum discharge of 17 × 106m3/s and total amount of water discharged equal to the maximum estimated volume of Lake Missoula (2184 km3). Neglecting erosion effects, their simulated water flow was based on modern-day topography. Their major findings were that the calculated depth of water in each flooded location except for the Spokane Valley–Rathdrum Prairie was shallower than the field evidence showed. For example, their calculated water depth at the Pasco Basin–Wallula Gap transition zone is about 190 m, significantly less than the 280–300 m flood depth indicated by high-water marks. They concluded that a flood of ~106m3/s could not have made the observed high-water marks.

In comment on the Komatsu analysis, Atwater's team observed that there is substantial evidence for multiple large floods, including evidence of mud cracks and animal burrows in lower layers which were filled by sediment from later floods. Further, evidence for multiple flood flows up side arms of Glacial Lake Columbia spread over many centuries have been found.  They also pointed out that the discharge point from Lake Columbia varied with time, originally flowing across the Waterville Plateau into Moses Coulee but later, when the Okanagon lobe blocked that route, eroding the Grand Coulee to discharge there as a substantially lower outlet. The Komatsu analysis does not evaluate the impact of the considerable erosion observed in this basin during the flood or floods, although the assumption that the flood hydraulics can be modeled using modern-day topography is an area which warrants further consideration. Earlier narrower constrictions at places such as Wallula Gap and through the Columbia Gorge would be expected to produce higher flow resistance and correspondingly higher floods.

The current understanding
The dating for Waitt's proposed separation of layers into sequential floods has been supported by subsequent paleomagnetism studies, which supports a 30–40 year interval between depositions of Mount St. Helens’ ash, and hence flood events, but do not preclude an up to 60 year interval.  Offshore deposits on the bed of the Pacific at the mouth of the Columbia River include 120 meters of material deposited over a several thousand-year period that corresponds to the period of multiple scabland floods seen in the Touchet Beds.  Based on Waitt's identification of 40 floods, this would give an average separation between floods of 50 years.

See also

References

Further reading

External links

 USGS Circular 1254 The World's Largest Floods, Past and Present: Their Causes and Magnitudes
 PBS's NOVA (TV series): Mystery of the Megaflood
 Ice Age Floods Institute (IAFI)
 
 
 
 The channeled scabland: a guide to the geomorphology of the Columbia Basin, Washington : prepared for the Comparative Planetary Geology Field Conference held in the Columbia Basin, June 5–8, 1978 / sponsored by Planetary Geology Program, Office of Space Science, National Aeronautics and Space Administration ; edited by Victor R. Baker and Dag Nummedal.
 National Park Service: Ice Age Floods
 Sculpted by Floods: The Northwest's Ice Age Legacy (KSPS Documentaries)\

Floods in the United States
Geology of Montana
Geology of Oregon
Geology of Washington (state)
Columbia River Gorge
Megafloods
Glacial landforms